RNA thermometers regulate gene expression in response to temperature allowing pathogens like Yersinia to switch on silent genes after entering the host organism. Usually, RNA thermometers are located in the 5'UTR, but an intergenic RNA thermometer was found in Yersinia pseudotuberculosis. The LcrF RNA thermometer together with the thermo-labile YmoA protein activates  synthesis of the most crucial virulence activator LcrF (VirF). The RNA thermosensor sequence is 100% identical in all human pathogenic Yersinia species.

References 

Non-coding RNA
Cis-regulatory RNA elements